The Kyiv National University of Construction and Architecture (informally referred to as KNUCA) –  better known under its former name Kyiv Civil Engineering Institute – is the largest and most important building and architectural university of Ukraine located in the nation's capital, Kyiv.

History
The institution was founded in 1930 as the Kyiv Civil Engineering Institute on the basis of factory and communal construction branch of the Kyiv Polytechnic Institute (KPI) and the architecture faculty of the Kyiv Art Institute.  During the post-World War II Soviet period, KISI rose to become the second highest engineering and architecture faculty in the USSR, behind the Moscow Civil Engineering Institute (МИСИ).

By the Decree of the Cabinet of Ministers of Ukraine of August 13, 1993, the Kyiv State Technical University of Construction and Architecture was created on the basis of the Kyiv Civil Engineering Institute. On February 28, 1999, by the Decree of the President of Ukraine (217/99) the university was accorded the status of a National University as "Kyiv National University of Construction and Architecture."

Student life

Educational and scientific work is organized and carried out by more than 96 chairs numbering about 800 professors and instructors.

About 10,500 students study at the university. After the graduation, they acquire the education qualification levels of Bachelor, Specialist, and Master of Science. The postgraduate courses in about 30 specialities are available at the university for those who choose to continue their professional and scientific training under the guidance of experienced advisers. The postgraduate preparation functions at the University, 9 specialized Scientific Councils for protection of the doctor's and candidate dissertations in 25 scientific specialties, 7 research institutes and 11 specialized research laboratories works.

The campus area includes six education cases, center of information technologies and computer-aided specialized laboratories, sports complex, library complex and reading hall (more than 1 million publications), eight hostels, hotel, sanatorium, educational-rehabilitation camp, food enterprises, etc.

Academics 
KNUCA is a large research university with a majority of enrollments in undergraduate & graduate and professional programs.

Undergraduate and graduate 
Faculty of Architecture;
Faculty of Construction;
Faculty of Construction technological;
Faculty of Automation and information technologies;
Faculty of Geoinformation systems and territory management technologies;

Faculty of Engineering Systems and Ecology 
Dean - Professor Oleksandr Priymak, D.Sc.

The history of the faculty begins from the date of foundation of university (1898).

Students obtain bachelor's and master's degrees in the following specialities:

- Ecology (specialization - Ecology and environmental protection);

- Heat energy (specialization - Energy Management);

- Environmental protection technologies (specialization - Environmental protection technologies);

- Construction and civil engineering.

The faculty consists of five departments:

Department of water supply and drainage

Department of labor protection and environment 
Head - Professor Tetiana Tkachenko, D.Sc.,

Other leaderships:

- professor Olena Voloshkina, D.Sc.

- Professor Tetiana Krivomaz, D.Sc.

Source: Department of labor protection and environment of KNUCA

Department of heat and gas supply and ventilation

Department of heat engineering

Department of physics

Faculty of Urbanism and Spatial Planning

External divisions 
Institute of Innovative Education KNUCA;
Kyiv Industrial College KNUCA;
Nikolaev building college KNUCA;
Zhytomyr Technological College KNUCA;
Vinnytsya college of construction and architecture of KNUCA.

Additional educational and professional programs 
Distributed software systems and technologies, graduate (MSc);
Environmental and Industrial Design, graduate (MSc).

Research 
KNUCA conduct high research activity. About 300 graduate students are currently (2021) focused on their individual research projects.

The principal of the postgraduate division is professor Vitalii Ploskyi, D.Sc.

People associated with KNUCA 

 Prof. Alexey Sidelev, PhD, PE, New York University, Civil Engineering
 Oleksandr Jakovyč Chorchot (Aleksandr Jakovlevič Chorchot), (1907-1993), Ukrainian architect
 Heorhyj Oleksandrovyč (Aleksandrovič) Chorchot, (*1939), Ukrainian architect
 Prof. Radoslav Zuk (*1926), Ukrainian architect in Canada, emeritus professor at McGill University, honorary professor at KNUCA
 Riyadh A. Amir, PhD, Austrian architect, Master of Architecture (1968)
 Jurij Fedorovyč Chudjakov, (*1934), Ukrainian architect
 Prof. Dr. Jurij Chetverikov, Ukrainian architect
 Prof. Khun-Neay Khuon, Master of Architecture (1960-1966), dean of the Faculty of Architecture at Royal University of Fine Arts, Phnom Penh, Cambodia (1968-1975)
 Prof. Sergey Bushuyev, professor and head of the Department of Project Management at KNUCA
 Dmitry Tsymlyakoff, Master of Computer Science, CAD and CAM systems, Silicon Valley, California
 Dr. Dr. habil. Leon Mishnaevsky Jr (*1964), senior scientist, Risoe National Laboratory, Denmark
 Prof. Dr. Türköz Kolozali (*1960), Bachelor/Master/PhD (1983-1993), professor of Architecture/Chairman of Architecture Department, Near East University, Nicosia, Cyprus
 Artem Matviienko (*1994) - IT Project Manager - EltexSoft
 Tamara Tselikovska - Ukrainian architect
 Ben Huffman (*1990) - leading assistant in EPTA. Master of food delivery business.
 Alan Jara (*1957) Bachelor/Master. Colombian civil engineer and politician.
 Slava Balbek (*1983) Bachelor/Master. Ukrainian architect.

Awards and reputation
Rating of Ukrainian universities "Compass"-2012 – 5th place;
In the branch of construction and architecture – 1st place.

Co-operations
 Augsburg University of Applied Sciences, Germany
 The FernUni Hagen/ University in Hagen, Germany
 HAWK University of Applied Sciences and Arts, Hildesheim/Holzminden/Goettingen, Germany
 Technical University at Braunschweig, Germany
 Carinthia University of Applied Sciences (CUAS), Austria
 VGTU Vilnius Gediminas Technical University, Lithuania
 Donetsk National Technical University, Ukraine

References

External links
 Kyiv National University of Construction and Architecture website
 Archived KNUBA website

Universities and colleges in Kyiv
Technical universities and colleges in Ukraine
National universities in Ukraine
Architecture in Ukraine
Education in the Soviet Union
Universities and institutes established in the Soviet Union
Igor Sikorsky Kyiv Polytechnic Institute
 
Educational institutions established in 1930
1930 establishments in Ukraine
Institutions with the title of National in Ukraine